1946–47 was the thirty-fourth occasion on which the Lancashire Cup completion had been held.

Wigan won the trophy by beating Belle Vue Rangers by the score of 9-3.

The match was played at Station Road, Pendlebury, (historically in the county of Lancashire). The attendance was 21,648 and receipts were £2,658.

Although it could not have been known at this time, this was to be the first of Wigan’s record breaking run of six consecutive Lancashire Cup victories.

It was also to be the first of two consecutive finals to be competed for by these two teams.

Background 

The number of teams entering showed little change from before the war.

Leigh returned to the sport using a rented athletic stadium while their purpose built stadium was under construction.

Overall, the number of teams entering this year’s competition increased by one with the return of Leigh bringing the total up to 13.

The same pre-war fixture format was retained. This season saw one bye and one “blank” or “dummy” fixture in the first round. The second round also had one bye, but now no “blank” fixture”.

As last season, all the first round ties of the competition was played on the basis of two legged, home and away, ties. In addition, this season, the second round was also on a two leg, home and away basis.

Competition and results

Round 1 
Involved 6 matches (with one bye and one “blank” fixture) and 13 clubs

Round 1 – second leg 
Involved 6 matches (with two “blank” fixture) and 12 clubs. These are the reverse fixture from the first leg

Round 2 – quarterfinals – first leg 
Involved 3 matches (with one bye) and 7 clubs

Round 2 – quarterfinals – second leg 
Involved 3 matches (with one bye) and 7 clubs. These are the reverse fixture from the first leg

Round 3 – semifinals 
Involved 2 matches and 4 clubs

Final

Teams and scorers

Scoring - Try = three (3) points - Goal = two (2) points - Drop goal = two (2) points

The road to success 
All the first and second round ties were played on a two leg (home and away) basis.

The first club named in each of the first and second round ties played the first leg at home.

the scores shown in the first and second round are the aggregate score over the two legs.

Notes and comments 

 The first Lancashire Cup match played by the newly name club
 Leigh's belated return to the sport after the war years
 The first Lancashire Cup match to be played at Leigh's temporary home 
 Station Road was the home ground of Swinton from 1929 to 1932 and at its peak was one of the finest rugby league grounds in the country and it boasted a capacity of 60,000. The actual record attendance was for the Challenge Cup semi-final on 7 April 1951 when 44,621 watched Wigan beat Warrington 3-2

See also 
1946–47 Northern Rugby Football League season
Rugby league county cups

References

External links
Saints Heritage Society
1896–97 Northern Rugby Football Union season at wigan.rlfans.com
Hull&Proud Fixtures & Results 1896/1897
Widnes Vikings - One team, one passion Season In Review - 1896-97
The Northern Union at warringtonwolves.org

1946 in English rugby league
RFL Lancashire Cup